SS Fairport may refer to one of two Type C2-S-E1 ships built by Gulf Shipbuilding for the United States Maritime Commission:

  (MC hull number 1614), scrapped in 1970

or may refer to:
 SS Fairport of Liverpool dragged her anchor and beached on Porthcurno beach on 28 December 1908; towed off the following day

References

Ship names